Terra incognita is a 2002 Lebanese-French drama film directed by Ghassan Salhab. It was screened in the Un Certain Regard section at the 2002 Cannes Film Festival.

Cast
 Carol Abboud - Soraya
 Abla Khoury - Leila
 Walid Sadek - Nadim
 Rabih Mroué - Tarek
 Carlos Chahine - Haidar

References

External links

2002 films
2000s Arabic-language films
2000s French-language films
2002 drama films
Films directed by Ghassan Salhab
Lebanese drama films
French drama films
2002 multilingual films
Lebanese multilingual films
French multilingual films
2000s French films